This is a list of defunct airlines of Bosnia and Herzegovina.

See also
 List of airlines of Bosnia and Herzegovina
 List of airports in Bosnia and Herzegovina
 List of airlines of Yugoslavia

References

Bosnia and Herzegovina
Airlines
Airlines, defunct